Ho Chi Minh Stock Exchange (HOSE), formerly known as HCM Securities Trading Center, is a stock exchange in Ho Chi Minh City, Vietnam. It was established in 1998 under Decision No. 127/1998/QD-TTg of the Prime Minister of Vietnam. HCM Securities Trading Center officially opened on July 20, 2000, and had its first trading session on July 28, 2000, with two listed companies and six security company members.

The current HCMSE building formerly housed the Senate of the Republic of Vietnam until the Fall of Saigon in 1975.

According to Decision No. 599/2007/QD-TTg of the Prime Minister in 2007, HCM Securities Trading Center was transformed into HCM Stock Exchange, with initial charter capital of VND 1,000 billion and the Ministry of Finance as the owner representing the agency. The charter capital was adjusted to VND 2,000 billion in 2015.

The Prime Minister issued Decision No. 37/2020/QD-TTg on December 23, 2020, establishing of the Vietnam Stock Exchange. Accordingly, The Hanoi Stock Exchange and Ho Chi Minh Stock Exchange became subsidiaries with 100% of charter capital owned by the Vietnam Stock Exchange.

About Vietnam Stock Exchange
Vietnam Stock Exchange was established as a one-member limited liability company to organize a security trading market. Its VND 3,000 billion charter capital is held by the State. It has bank accounts with the State Treasury and domestic commercial banks that do business in Vietnam dong and foreign currencies. By national law, the exchange is tasked with financial regimes, statistical reporting, accounting, and auditing.

Duties and power of house
The following are the duties and powers of the house according to the organization and operation charter of the Ho Chi Minh City Stock Exchange issued together with Decision No. 07/QD-HDTV dated July 9, 2021:

 Organize and operate the stock trading market, a securities auction system, fund certificates, covered warrants, and other securities trading markets 
 Suspend trading if there are abnormal fluctuations in price and trading volume to protect the rights, interests, safety, and stability of investors
 Approve, change, or cancel a listing
 Register securities trading
 Supervise the information disclosure by listing companies
 Provide the technology infrastructure for the stock market
 Inspect and handle violations against listing companies and those registered for trading

Products

Trading products 
Currently, Ho Chi Minh Stock Exchange is trading securities products such as stocks, bonds, closed fund certificates, ETF certificates, and covered warrants.

At the end of June 30, 2021, it had 488 listed trading securities products, including 385 stocks, two closed fund certificates, seven ETF certificates, 65 covered warrants, and 29 bonds. It included more than 103,88 billion listed stocks, and the value of listed capital was more than 5,28 million billion VND.

Indexes

VNIndex 
VNIndex was the first index of the Vietnamese stock market. It compares the current values of market capital to the base value of market capital. The value of market capital is calculated by the index formula which is adjusted in scenarios such as new listings, delistings, and changes in listing capital. VNIndex calculating formula: VN Index = (Current market value / Base market value) x 100

HOSE index 
The HOSE Index was launched in 2014. It allows HOSE's listing stocks to reach requirements on eligibility, free-floating rate, and liquidity. HOSE Index accounts for more than 90% trading value and more than 80% capital value of listing Vietnamese stocks in HOSE.

Structure of HOSE Index:

 VNAllshare is a capitalization index consisting of stocks listed on HOSE that meet the screening requirements for eligibility, freely transferable ratio, and liquidity.
 VN30 is a capitalization index designed to measure the growth of the top thirty companies in terms of market capitalization and liquidity in VNAllshare.
 VNMidcap is a capitalization index that measures the growth of seventy medium-sized companies in VNAllshare.
 VN100: is a market capitalization index combining component stocks of VN30 and VNMidcap.
 VNSmallcap is a capitalization index designed to measure the growth of small-sized companies in VNAllshare.
 VNAllshare Sector Indices include industry indices with VNAllshare's component stocks, classified according to the Global Industry Classification Standard (GICS®).
 VNSI is a price index calculated using the free-float adjusted market capitalization method with the composition of the listed companies with the best sustainable development scores. It has a real-time calculation frequency of five seconds.

Sector indices 
Currently, HOSE has ten sector indices:

 Consumers sector (VNCONS)
 Energy sector (VNENE)
 Financial sector (VNFIN)
 Healthcare sector (VNHEAL)
 Material sector (VNMAT)
 Industrial sector (VNIND)
 Information Technology Sector  (VNIT)
 Material sector (VNMAT)
 Real Estate sector (VNREAL)
 Utilities sector (VNUTI)

Investment indices 
In November 2019, HOSE introduced a modified index to adapt to the investment needs of domestic fund companies. Specifically, the Vietnam Leading Financial Index (VNFIN LEAD) Vietnam Financial Select Sector Index (VNFINSELECT), and Vietnam Diamond Index (VN DIAMOND).

Trading activity 
The Ho Chi Minh Stock Exchange trades Monday through Friday, except on public holidays. The trading limit for stocks and fund certificates is +/-7%; this does not apply to bonds. On the first trading day of a new listing stock, the trading limit is +/-20%.

Listing on HOSE 
Listing requirements, applied according to Decree 155/2020/ND-CP detailing

See also
 Economy of Vietnam
 Hanoi Securities Trading Center
 List of Southeast Asian stock exchanges

References

Economy of Ho Chi Minh City
Economy of Vietnam
Financial services companies established in 2000
Stock exchanges in Southeast Asia
Stock exchanges in Vietnam